William Foote Whyte (June 27, 1914 – July 16, 2000) was an American sociologist chiefly known for his ethnographic study in urban sociology, Street Corner Society. A pioneer in participant observation, he lived for four years in an Italian community in Boston while a Junior Fellow at Harvard researching social relations of street gangs in Boston's North End.

Early life
Whyte, from an upper-middle-class background, showed an early interest in writing, economics and social reform. After graduating from Swarthmore College,  he was selected for the Junior Fellows program, where his landmark research was done. After his research in Boston, he entered the sociology doctoral program at the University of Chicago. Street Corner Society was published by the University of Chicago Press in 1943. He spent a year teaching at the University of Oklahoma, but developed polio in 1943 and spent two years in physical therapy at the Warm Springs Foundation. Rehabilitation was only partially successful; Whyte walked with a cane for the rest of his life, and used two arm crutches in his later years.

Professional career
He briefly returned to the University of Chicago in 1944, then joined the New York State School of Industrial and Labor Relations at Cornell University in 1948, remaining at Cornell for the remainder of his career. At Cornell he supervised Chris Argyris with his doctorate. He worked for social reform and social change, directing his efforts toward "empowering the disenfranchized and narrowing the gap between rich and poor." He studied industrial and agricultural workers and workers' cooperatives in Venezuela, Peru, Guatemala and in the Basque region of Spain, as well as in the United States. He authored hundreds of articles and 20 books including an autobiography. He is considered a pioneer in industrial sociology.

Family
At his death William F. Whyte was survived by his wife, Kathleen (King) Whyte, his sons Martin King Whyte and John Whyte, and his daughters Joyce Wiza and Lucy Whyte Ferguson.

Education
Professor Whyte received his bachelor's degree in economics from Swarthmore College in 1936,  and was selected for the Junior Fellows program at Harvard University, where his landmark research was done. After his research in Boston, he entered the sociology doctoral program at the University of Chicago.

Association
Whyte served as the president of the American Sociological Association in 1981 and also of the Society for Applied Anthropology in 1964.

Further reading
 William Foote Whyte, Street Corner Society: The Social Structure of an Italian Slum University of Chicago Press (4th edition, 1993), trade paperback, ; hardcover, University of Chicago Press (3rd edition, revised and expanded, 1981, ; earlier editions available on ABE
 William Foote Whyte, Participant Observer: An Autobiography, Cornell University Press (1994), trade paperback, 
 William Foote Whyte, Creative Problem Solving in the Field: Reflections on a Career, Rowman and Littlefield (1997), trade paperback, ; hardcover, 
 William Foote Whyte & Kathleen King Whyte, Making Mondragon:  The Growth and Dynamics of the Worker Cooperative Complex, ILR Press (an imprint of Cornell University Press), Ithaca & London, 1988,

References

External links

 Picture and Information about Whyte at the American Sociological Association
 Guide to the William Foote Whyte. Additional papers. #/4087. Kheel Center for Labor-Management Documentation and Archives, Cornell University Library.

1914 births
2000 deaths
American sociologists
American cooperative organizers
Harvard Fellows
Cornell University faculty
Swarthmore College alumni
University of Chicago alumni
Presidents of the American Sociological Association
People from Lansing, New York
20th-century American anthropologists